"Love Will Lead You Back" is a song recorded by American singer Taylor Dayne for her second studio album, Can't Fight Fate (1989). Written by Diane Warren and produced by Ric Wake, the song was released on January 20, 1990, by Arista Records as the second single from the album.

"Love Will Lead You Back" reached number one on the US Billboard Hot 100 on April 7, 1990 and spent 15 weeks in the top 40, becoming Dayne's sole chart-topping hit in the US. It also reached number one on the Billboard Adult Contemporary chart and was certified Gold by the Recording Industry Association of America (RIAA). In addition to its US success, the song peaked at number two in Canada, number 11 in Australia, number 28 in New Zealand and number 69 in the United Kingdom.

Background
The song, written by American songwriter Diane Warren, is about a woman who is willing to set her lover free because she is confident that one day his love will lead him back to her; "Sometimes it takes some time out on your own now / to find your way back home". Warren has stated that she began writing the song while in a hotel in Russia and that she had Whitney Houston in mind, but Arista Records president Clive Davis wanted to let Dayne record the song.

Critical reception
Matthew Hocter from Albumism stated that "Love Will Lead You Back" is "going on to be one of Dayne's most synonymous songs", noting "the phenomenal balladry" the singer delivered on the song. Jose F. Promis from AllMusic described it as a "lush and dramatic" ballad. David Giles from Music Week wrote, "Something of a change in style for Taylor Dayne, this track from her current album is a big ballad in the Lionel Richie tradition and recently a US chart topper — so expect that success to be repeated over here." A reviewer from People Magazine noted that the singer can "dig for depth and rich tone on such ballads as Warren's "Love Will Lead You Back"."

Music video
The accompanying music video for "Love Will Lead You Back" was very simple. Directed by English director Nigel Dick, it shows Dayne and her band in a studio performing the song. The music video was released both in black-and-white and sepia tones. In the music video, Dayne holds in her hand what seems to be the lyrics of the song, or possibly a letter from her lover.

Charts

Weekly charts

Year-end charts

Certifications

Covers
The song was covered by Brazilian singer Sandra de Sá, by Filipina singers Kyla, Nina, and Marika Sasaki and also Filipino crooner Jun Polistico and Australian pop group Young Divas. Mexican showgirl Yuri recorded a Spanish-language adaptation of the song as "Quién eres tú" on her studio album Soy Libre (1991). Yuri's version peaked at number eight on the Billboard Hot Latin Songs chart in the US.

In 2000, Grammy Award-winning artist Patti LaBelle covered the composition for her album, When a Woman Loves. Dutch pop singer Gordon also covered the song in 1994 and American Crooner Johnny Mathis also covered his version of the song from his 1998 album, Because You Loved Me.

On American Idol it has been covered three times, by Carmen Rasmusen (season 2), Mikalah Gordon (season 4) and Karen Rodriguez (season 10). All three were eliminated the next night after their performances of that song.

See also
List of Billboard Hot 100 number-one singles of 1990
List of number-one adult contemporary singles of 1990 (U.S.)

References

The Billboard Book of Top 40 Hits, 6th Edition, 1996
The Billboard Book of #1 Hits, 5th Edition, 2003

1990 singles
1991 singles
Taylor Dayne songs
Billboard Hot 100 number-one singles
Cashbox number-one singles
Songs written by Diane Warren
Song recordings produced by Ric Wake
Pop ballads
Arista Records singles
Sony Discos singles
1989 songs
Soul ballads
1980s ballads
Black-and-white music videos
Yuri (Mexican singer) songs